Multidentula is a genus of minute air-breathing land snail, a terrestrial pulmonate gastropod mollusk in the family Enidae.

Species 
Species within the genus Multidentula include:
 Multidentula lamellifera (Rossmässler, 1858)
 Multidentula nachicevanjensis (Hudec, 1972) 
 Multidentula ovularis (Olivier, 1801)
 Multidentula pupoides (Krynicki, 1833)
 Multidentula reducta Bank, Menkhorst & Neubert, 2016
 Multidentula ridens (Nägele, 1906)
 Multidentula squalina (L. Pfeiffer, 1848)
 Multidentula stylus (L. Pfeiffer, 1848)

References

 Lindholm, W. A. (1925). Nachtrag zur Synonymie einiger Gattungen der Enidae. Archiv für Molluskenkunde. 57 (4): 140-142. Frankfurt am Main 
 Schileyko, A.A. (1978). Issledovanie tipovykh vidov nekotorykh taksonov rodovoj gruppy v semejstve Buliminidae (= Enidae) (Gastropoda). 3. Vidy Kryma i Kavkaza. Voprosy sistemy semejstva. Zoologicheskii Zhurnal, 57 (6): 834-850. Moskva. A study of type species in some taxa of the generic group in the family Buliminidae (= Enidae) (Gastropoda). 3. Species of Crimea and Caucasus. Problems of taxonomy of the family].
 Bank, R. (2017). Classification of the Recent terrestrial Gastropoda of the World. Last update: July 16th, 2017

Enidae
Gastropod genera
Taxa named by Wassili Adolfovitch Lindholm